Young Park is a park and music venue in Las Cruces, New Mexico.

It is located at 1905 E. Nevada Avenue.

References

Las Cruces, New Mexico